Alenchery is a village in Kollam district of Kerala, India. It lies on the way from Anchal to Kulazhupuzha.

See also 
Anchal 
Kulathupuzha

References

Villages in Kollam district

Kollam